Defending champions Nikola Mektić and Mate Pavić defeated Matwé Middelkoop and Luke Saville in the final, 6–4, 6–2, to win the men's doubles tennis title at the 2022 Eastbourne International. Without dropping a set en route to their successful title defense, the pair also earned their fourth ATP Tour doubles title of the season.

Seeds

Draw

Draw

References

External links
Main draw

Eastbourne International - Men's doubles
2022 Men's doubles